Hechuan Township is a township under the administration of Yuanzhou District, Guyuan, Ningxia, China. , it has ten villages under its administration:
Haiping Village
Kanggou Village
Zhaiwa Village
Shangtai Village
Mingchuan Village
Luotuohe Village
Huanghe Village
Shangping Village
Shanghuang Village
Mujiagou Village

References 

Township-level divisions of Ningxia
Guyuan